Amalprava Das, also known as Amal Prabha Das, (1911–1994) was an Indian social worker, Gandhian and the founder of Kasturba Ashram at Sarania Hills, Assam, a self help group for women and their economic upliftment and Guwahati Yubak Sevadal, a non governmental organization working for the social development of harijans. The Government of India honoured her in 1954, with the award of Padma Shri, the fourth highest Indian civilian award for her contributions to the society, placing her among the first recipients of the award. A recipient of the 1981 Jamnalal Bajaj Award, Das was honoured again by the Government of India with the second highest civilian award of Padma Vibhushan which she declined to accept.

Biography
Amalprava was born on 12 November 1911 in a rich family to noted Gandhian couple, Hare Krishna Das and Hema Prabha Das in Dibrugarh in the Northeast Indian state of Assam. She did her schooling at local educational institutions, but was denied admission at the local Cotton College and had to move to Bethune College in Calcutta for college studies from where she passed the school leaving (or university entrance) examination in 1929. Later she joined the Scottish Church College and earned a bachelor's degree (BSc) in chemistry and a master's degree (MSc) in applied chemistry, and in so doing, became the first Assamese woman to obtain a master's degree in science. She continued her studies to gain a diploma in clinical pathology and refused a teaching job at the British run Cotton College citing patriotic reasons.

In 1934 Das had an opportunity to interact with Mahatma Gandhi when the leader of the Indian freedom movement stayed at her house during a visit to Guwahati. This meeting is reported to have influenced her and guided her in her future endeavors. She established Maitri Ashram (later renamed as Kasturba Ashram) in a property owned by her father in Sarania Hills which was later donated to Kasturba Memorial Trust. Under the aegis of the ashram, she organized training for the womenfolk of the village in cottage industries so that they might become financially self-reliant. She also founded several institutions such as Gram Sevika Vidyalaya, Kasturba Kalyan Kendra, Gauhati Katai Mandal, Guwahati Yubak Sevadal and Assam Go-Seva Samiti.

When the Government of India introduced the Padma Awards in 1954, she was included for the award of Padma Shri. She received the Jamnalal Bajaj Award in 1981 for "Outstanding Contribution in Constructive Work". The Government of India selected her later for the second highest civilian award of Padma Vibhushan, but she declined the award due to apathy towards public honours. Her life and times have been recorded in the book, A Biography, published in 1986, after her demise. The Department of Social Welfare of the Government of Assam has instituted an award in her honour, Amal Prava Das Award which is being awarded for commitment and excellence in social service since 2013. The department is in the process of making a documentary depicting the life of Amalprava Das.

See also

 Kasturba Gandhi
 Shakuntala Choudhary

References

Recipients of the Padma Shri in public affairs
1911 births
People from Dibrugarh district
Scholars from Assam
Social workers
Gandhians
Year of death missing
Bethune College alumni
Scottish Church College alumni
University of Calcutta alumni
20th-century Indian women
20th-century Indian educational theorists
Women educators from Assam
Educators from Assam
Indian independence activists from Assam
Women Indian independence activists
Social workers from Assam
20th-century women educators